The Flaming Gorge - Uintas Scenic Byway is a National Scenic Byway in the state of Utah.

Route description

The south end of this route starts out in Vernal, Uintah County at the intersection of US-40 and US-191. From there, it travels north on US-191, enters Ashley National Forest, and passes Steinaker State Park and Red Fleet State Park as it starts to climb into the Uinta Mountains. As it  gradually starts to descend it enters Daggett County before it enters Flaming Gorge National Recreation Area. Just inside the recreation area boundaries, the route splits in two.

Taking the right branch continues on US-191 to the northeast, passing over an inlet to Flaming Gorge Reservoir via a suspension bridge, before crossing Flaming Gorge Dam, and passing by the town of Dutch John. From here the route curves back around the southwest portion of Flaming Gorge reservoir, travelling northwest to Dutch John Gap, turning north through the gap, and turning to the northeast again after exiting Flaming Gorge National Recreation Area, continuing until the Wyoming state border.

Taking the left branch, the route follows SR-44 westward, which forms the southern boundary of the recreation area in this area, roughly following the southern rim of Flaming Gorge, passing a turnoff to the Red Canyon Overlook and Visitors Center. As SR-44 approaches the western edge of the recreation area, it starts to turn in a northerly direction overall, descending in a series of turns as it approaches the southwestern tip of Flaming Gorge Reservoir and passes through Sheep Creek Gap. From this point, the route turns north, exits the recreation area, and continues a few miles further before it ends at the intersection of SR-43 in Manila.

History
For the histories of this route's constituent highways prior to its scenic byway designation, refer to:
 US-191
 SR-44

The scenic byway was formed in 1988 as Utah's first Forest Service Byway. It was added to the National Scenic Byways system on June 9, 1998.

Major intersections

Southern portion

Northeast branch (US-191)

Northwest branch (SR-44)

References

External links

 

Utah Scenic Byways
National Scenic Byways
Transportation in Uintah County, Utah
Transportation in Daggett County, Utah
National Forest Scenic Byways
Tourist attractions in Uintah County, Utah
Tourist attractions in Daggett County, Utah
Ashley National Forest